Keith Pickard (born 1962) is a former Republican member of the Nevada Senate. He represented the 20th district, which covers parts of the southern Las Vegas Valley. Pickard formerly represented the 22nd district in the Nevada Assembly.

Biography
Keith Pickard was born in Long Beach, California, in 1962, moving to Portland, Oregon, at the age of five. He graduated from Brigham Young University in 1990 and received his Juris Doctor from the William S. Boyd School of Law in 2011.

Pickard ran for the Assembly in 2016, defeating Richard Bunce in the Republican primary and Luis Aguirre-Insua in the general election.

Pickard ran for the Nevada Senate in 2018, for the seat being vacated by state Senate Minority Leader Michael Roberson, defeating Byron Brooks in the Republican primary and Julie Pazina in the General Election.

Electoral history

References

External links
 
 Campaign website
 Legislative website

1962 births
Living people
Latter Day Saints from Nevada
Brigham Young University alumni
Republican Party members of the Nevada Assembly
Nevada lawyers
People from Henderson, Nevada
People from Long Beach, California
Politicians from Portland, Oregon
William S. Boyd School of Law alumni
21st-century American politicians